Novomedvedevo (Yañı Ayıw) is a rural locality (a village) and the administrative centre of Novomedvedevsky Selsoviet, Ilishevsky District, Bashkortostan, Russia. The population was 259 as of 2010. There are 4 streets.

Geography 
Novomedvedevo is located 34 km north of Verkhneyarkeyevo (the district's administrative centre) by road. Starokirgizovo is the nearest rural locality.

References 

Rural localities in Ilishevsky District